Salman Zain Al Deen a Lebanese poet, author, novelist and critic who also works as educational inspector. His works include poems, prose and literary criticism, especially of novels.

Works and writings 
His works include:

 "Lanterns and wind," poem, Dar Noufel for Publishing, 2009,
 "Supplies of the Road", poem, 2002,
 The Cage of Freedom, 2007,
 Shehrezad and the Allowed Talk, reading in women's novels, published by Arab Scientific Publishers, Inc., 2010,
 Rainbow, Nelsen Publishers, Sweden and Beirut, 2011,
 Separate Consciences, poetry collection published in 2015 by Nelsen Publishers in Sweden and Beirut, with cover and illustrations painted by the Lebanese artist Amine Al- Basha,
 "Passages," poem, published by Nelsen Publishers in Sweden and Beirut, 2016,
 Honourable Men, a critical study, Dhfaf Lebanese Publishing House and Algerian Ikhtilaf Publishing House, 2017, including a critical reading in 60 Arabic novels, the Palestinian library “Kul Shei” and Dar Kalema publishing house in Tunisia,
 "The States of Water," poem, Dhfaf Lebanese Publishing House and Algerian Ikhtilaf Publishing House, 2018,
 When Shahriar Tells the story, a reading in 50 Arabic novels, Arab Scientific Publishers, Inc., Beirut,
 I’ve Been Told, Majesty the King, a reading in women's novels, Arab Scientific Publishers, Inc.
 Once Upon a Time, criticism, Arab Scientific Publishers, Inc.
 In the Drift of a Novel, published by Hamad bin Khalifa University Publishing House, 2020, including critical readings of 30 Arabic novels.

Awards 
 Saeed Fiyadh Award for poetic creativity.
 Saeed Aqle Award for poem.

References 

Lebanese journalists
Arab journalists
20th-century Lebanese poets
Lebanese writers
Lebanese literary critics
Year of birth missing (living people)
Living people